Fathabad-e Yazdiha (also Romanized as Fatḩābād-e Yazdīhā) is a village in Miyan Velayat Rural District, in the Central District of Mashhad County, Razavi Khorasan Province, Iran. At the 2006 census, its population was 42, in 9 families.

References 

Populated places in Mashhad County